"I'll Never Let You Go" (also titled "I'll Never Let You Go (Angel Eyes)") is a  power ballad by American glam metal band Steelheart. It was released as the second single from their 1990 self-titled debut album. It peaked at No. 23 on the Billboard Hot 100 and No. 24 on the Mainstream Rock chart. It is the band's highest charting single to date.

References

1990 songs
1990 singles
Steelheart songs
1990s ballads
MCA Records singles
Glam metal ballads